Religious Freedom Day commemorates the Virginia General Assembly's adoption of Thomas Jefferson's landmark Virginia Statute for Religious Freedom on January 16, 1786. The statute, written by Jefferson in 1777 and shepherded through the legislature by James Madison in 1786, became the basis for the establishment clause of the First Amendment of the U.S. Constitution and led to freedom of religion for all Americans.

Religious Freedom Day is commemorated on January 16 via a proclamation by the President of the United States since 1993. Legislation has been introduced in Minnesota to commemorate Religious Freedom Day in the state as well. It is not a federal holiday.

See also 

 International Religious Freedom Day

References

External links

Civil awareness days
January observances
Freedom of religion in the United States
Establishment Clause
Observances in the United States by presidential proclamation